Keith Robert DeVries (January 2, 1937 – July 16, 2006) was a prominent archaeologist and expert on the Phrygian city of Gordium, in what is now Turkey. He was born in Grand Rapids, Michigan.

DeVries earned his undergraduate degree at the University of Michigan and his doctorate at the University of Pennsylvania. From 1970 to 2004, he taught the latter university. He also worked for its Museum of Archaeology and Anthropology in the Mediterranean section.

As an excavator, DeVries worked at Ischia and the excavations at Ancient Corinth. His primary work was at Gordium; there he directed the excavations from 1977 to 1987.

In his last years, he was involved with a reassessment of the chronology of the Iron Age in Gordium and other parts of Anatolia. DeVries died of cancer in Philadelphia, Pennsylvania in 2006.

Works (incomplete)
 (Editor) From Athens to Gordion: the papers of a memorial symposium for Rodney S. Young, held at the University Museum, the third of May, 1975 (Philadelphia: University Museum, University of Pennsylvania, 1980).

References

 Art and Archaeology of the Mediterranean World Graduate Program - Alumni
 Obituary by Jeremy Pearce in The New York Times July 29, 2006.
 Gareth Darbyshire, Penn Museum obituary

External links 

 Keith R. DeVries papers held by the University of Pennsylvania Penn Museum Archives

1937 births
2006 deaths
American people of Dutch descent
Deaths from cancer in Pennsylvania
University of Michigan alumni
20th-century American archaeologists